Take Me Out was a dating game show that was presented by comedian Paddy McGuinness. Based on the Australian show Taken Out, it first aired on ITV in the United Kingdom and simulcast on TV3 in the Republic of Ireland on 2 January 2010. An unscreened pilot episode was made for Channel 4 in 2009, but it was ITV who picked it up for a series. The show was produced by Thames (formerly Talkback Thames). On 10 February 2020, ITV announced that the show was axed after eleven series.

The first series was recorded at Granada Studios in Manchester, but all series thereafter were recorded at The Maidstone Studios in Maidstone, Kent, as it offered increased space and capacity for audience members.

In 2012, the show introduced a spin-off show entitled Take Me Out: The Gossip, which aired on ITV2 and was co-hosted by Zoe Hardman and Mark Wright in 2012 and 2013. It did not air in 2014, but returned in 2015 with Wright joined by new co-host Laura Jackson.

On 10 February 2020, ITV announced that the show was axed after eleven series. Eight couples who met on the show subsequently got married and six babies were born to contestants who met on the show.

Format
The objective of the show was for a single man to obtain a date with one of thirty single women. The women stood on a stage underneath thirty white lights, each with a button in front of them. A single man was then brought down on stage via the 'Love Lift' and tried to persuade the women to agree to be his date in a series of rounds, playing a prerecorded video discussing his background, displaying a skill (such as dancing or playing a musical instrument), or playing another video in which the man's friends or family reveal more about his virtues and philosophy.

At any point during the rounds, the women could press the button in front of them to turn off their light if they did not want a date with the man. If this occurs, their area of the stage turned red. If, at the end of three rounds, there were still lights left on, the bachelor would turn off all but two of the remaining lights himself. He would then have a chance to ask one question to the last two women, before choosing which of the women he wanted to go on the date with by turning off one more light. If the man was left with two lights at the end of round 3, he would just ask his question to the two remaining women and if there was only one light left at the end of round 3, he will go on the date with that girl without asking her his question. There were usually four men brought on in the course of a single episode, though on some occasions segments were  cut and only three men were shown.

If all the women turned off their lights before the end of the third round - this was referred to as a "blackout" - then the man would have to leave the show without going on a date, accompanied by the Céline Dion version of the hit Eric Carmen song "All by Myself". In the first series, the successful couples conducted their date at FERNANDO'S! in Manchester, which is actually Club Bijou on Chapel Street, the outcome of which is shown as part of the following week's show. For the second series, the date took place abroad on the Isle of FERNANDO'S!, a fictional location based in Puerto de la Cruz, Tenerife. Previously the date took place in Cyprus. Successful couples left the programme upstairs on the opposite side of the studio to the 'Love Lift', and a song, usually from the latin pop genre, was played.

Comedic value was mostly provided by McGuinness's array of catchphrases such as "Let the (object) see the (object)", "No likey, no lighty!", "If you're turned off, turn off", "If he's not Mr Right, turn off your light", "Get out there, turn one girl off and take one girl out!", "Come and get some Paddy love!", "The isle of...FERNANDO'S!".

Round 1
In this round the man comes down the love lift. He meets the girls and then says his name and where he is from. Paddy repeats but afterwards with one of catchphrases. Then the girls can turn off their light. From series 7 onwards, they have to write down a 'love at first light' from the girls who had left their lights on.

Round 2
This includes a pre-recorded video presented by the man. It sometimes includes interviews with his friends and family. It describes his personality and what they do. At any point the girls can turn off their light.

Round 3
In this round the man shows a skill in the studio. Alternately their friend or family can say a secret. At any point the girl can turn off their light.

Round 4
In this round the man turns off the lights of the remaining girls until just two are left lit. Alternatively, if there is only one or two girls left from round 3 then round 4 is skipped entirely.

Round 5
In this round the man asks the girls who are remaining a question. The man then turns off the light of one girl. Paddy questions the chosen girl if they would rather know the man's 'love at first light' or not. Then they meet, go up the big stairs opposite the love lift and have a backstage interview. Alternatively, if only one girl remains lit from round 3 then the man gets to choose between her and a "mysterious girl", who remains unseen until he makes his choice.

Episodes and ratings
Episode viewing figures from BARB.
Key:
 – Successful dates
 – Got a blackout, but later dated another contestant

Series 1 (2010)

Series 2 (2010–11)

Series 3 (2012)

Notes
 : The date segment of contestant Wen scoring a date with freelance journalist Aaron was axed from the programme.
 : Two blackouts occurred in one programme, becoming the first time this had ever occurred on the show.
 : The studio segment of contestant Judi scoring a date with builder Mike was axed from the programme, after it transpired that Mike was known to the police as a suspected sex offender. Judi did not return to the show.
 : The studio segment of contestant Jade scoring a date with banker Rory was axed from the programme, after it transpired that Rory was serving a suspended sentence for common assault. Jade did not return to the show.
 : Chelsea revealed on the 7 April episode of Take Me Out: The Gossip that she and Ben, the first contestant of the series, were getting married.
 : David set a record for having the highest number of girls left in the final round in the third series, with 27 leaving their light on after round three. Amy Childs also later went on to date David.

Series 4 (2012)

Notes
 : Ben was the only contestant this series to receive a blackout on the second round.
 : Will and Henry became the first pair of twins to come down the love lift, and go on a double date with their chosen dates.
 : In the final round, Yinka let his little brother, Jono, choose which of the two girls he should pick out of all of the remaining lights.
 : Despite the fact that Myko got a blackout, he later began dating Erica (who originally got a date with Jim from episode 6). Erica admitted that she regretted turning her light off for him.
 : Jase set a record (at the time) for having the highest number of ladies left in the final round in the fourth series, with 23 girls leaving their light on after round three.
 : Jordan became the first contestant in the history of Take Me Out to still have all 30 girls with their lights on in the final round.
 : Damion and Daniella returned to Take Me Out: The Gossip in October, and revealed that they were getting married.

Lisa
Jade
Janet
Victoria
Priscilla 
Jessie
Yuki
Carol
Emma
Michelle
Jeanette
Chelsea
Rose
Alison 
Canadace

Sandy
Cinderella 
Claire
Melinda
Jess
Claudia
Andrea
Marsha
Rita
Trudy
Grace
Doris
Jasmine
Harriet
Vanessa

Series 5 (2013)

Series 6 (2014)

Series 7 (2015)

Notes
 : On the last episode of the series, whilst looking at the dates from the episode, Scott and Kat returned, saying that they were celebrating their 10-week anniversary in Fernando's.

Nicky
Michelle
Wendy
Sarah
Marsha
Yuki
Julia
Kony
Janet
Cinderella 
Karen
Lindsay
Jasmine
Izzy
Maggie

Courtney
Fancy
Cathy
Sandy
Angela
Amanda
Winter
Molly
Priscilla 
Chloe
Bridget
Doris
Cheryl
Harriet
Ruth

1ST Couple Lexi And Luca
2RD Couple Celine And Seamus
3RD Couple Jessie And Romeo
4TH Couple

Christmas Special (2016)

Valentine's Special (2017)

Series 9 (2017)

Series 10 (2018)

Notes
 : Bella was going to turn her light off during Round 3 but was so engaged in Phil's performance, she never did.

Anniversary Special (2018)

Notes
 : This episode was a celebrity special, and for the first time ever, females got to pick the males they wanted to date. This was also the show's 100th episode.
 : This episode featured a number of people from previous episodes who did not receive dates.

Golden Girls Special (2018)

Series 11 (2019)

Take Me Out: The Gossip
Take Me Out: The Gossip was a behind-the-scenes sister show that began airing weekly on ITV2 from series 3-5 and 7–9, following the broadcast of the main programme. Most recently, it was presented by Laura Jackson and Mark Wright. Zoe Hardman previously hosted the show with Wright.

A similar format, previously broadcast online, featuring backstage gossip and interviews with the contestants, was regularly made available on itv.com just hours after the broadcast of the main programme.

International versions

Reception

Viewership
Take Me Out has proven popular with the public, generally pulling over 3 million viewers per episode.

Critical reception
In its early days, Take Me Out was reviewed negatively by critics. Shortly after the second series began in December 2010, The Guardians Tim Dowling said that, "When you strip away its tired, utterly false premise, all that remains of Take Me Out is a lot of flashing lights and some scripted innuendo delivered in a range of regional accents." Reviewing the show after the second series concluded in March 2011, Manchester Grouch of Manchester Central wrote: "ITV should consider renaming the show 'Desperate Moron Lift Disco'" and concluded the review by comparing it to "[...]a drunken Saturday night out that ends up in a dodgy club having a quick fumble with that girl from the hairdressers you’ve been eyeing up all week." Writing for the Metro during the third series of the show in January 2012, Rachel Tarley said that Take Me Out was the "death knell for feminism disguised as entertainment".

However, after the beginning of the fifth series in January 2013, Julia Raeside, also writing for The Guardian, admitted that the show had become "must-see TV" and was "a worthy successor to Blind Date": "[...]when Take Me Out noisily barged its way on to the Saturday night schedules in 2010, it was too much for me. The little I'd seen of it put me off trying a whole episode. But about a series ago, Take Me Out really started to grow on me. One night, out of sheer laziness, I didn't bother to switch over – and now they've got me. I don't like nightclubs and I cover my upper arms at all times. But the women behind those podiums, however much I fail to identify with them for wanting to be on TV with their armpits constantly on show, make it gripping viewing."

Jim Brown

Wrestler Jim Brown, the first contestant on the first series, was accused of continually harassing his date Caroline Mellor despite the fact that their date did not work out. Caroline claimed to receive numerous phone calls and texts from him for over four months. Jim was later also charged with possession of child pornography on his computer. Prior to this, Jim was caught pleasuring himself in a Wishaw Sports Centre cubicle, which alerted the police to investigate him. On 21 March 2014, Jim was sentenced to two and a half years in prison for flouting a ban on going near children.

Damion Merry

The studio segment of contestant Chelsea Stewart scoring a date with model Damion Merry caused controversy when broadcast. During the third and final round, it became apparent that Damion used to date reality television series personality Jodie Marsh, and he later told one of the girls who had turned her light off, Lucy Harrold, that he would have picked her, offending all the girls who still had their lights on. It later transpired that not only was Damion not single at the time the programme was filmed, he was also about to marry his girlfriend Sarah Ann Gras; the segment was broadcast a month after the wedding took place. On This Morning, Marsh later denied having ever dated Damion, saying: "I tell you what, this guy - I went on one date with him, one date...We had pictures in a nightclub, he sold the pictures to the TV show or whoever and gave 'em away and now, it's being told that we had a whole full blown relationship and that I was his ex-girlfriend."

Rory Alexander

The studio segment of contestant Jade scoring a date with banker Rory Alexander was axed from the programme, after it transpired that Rory was serving a suspended sentence for common assault. Jade did not return to the show.

Jarvis Walters

The studio segment of contestant Hannah Reville scoring a date with semi-professional footballer Jarvis Walters was axed from the programme.

Param Singh

Many viewers were extremely offended when one of the girls, who had left her light on for contestant Param Singh, made a joke about contestant Param's turban, saying she was interested in him because she could use his turban to store her phone. Despite the fact Param himself took it light-heartedly, many Sikhs found this remark to be extremely offensive. Param later went on to describe the backlash that he received from sections of the Sikh community.

Fakery claims

In 2012, several of the contestants accused the show's producers of telling them whom to choose on each episode. Female contestants complained that they were forced to choose men who they didn't find attractive, while some of the show's male contestants went home without a date after the girls were told not to choose them.

"The whole thing is totally misleading and leaves a whole lot of people feeling humiliated and exploited afterwards," one girl who had appeared on the show told the media.

"The producers pulled some of the girls in and said, 'If you’re waiting for George Clooney or Brad Pitt, they’re not coming',"

"They told us to keep our lights on for the next contestant, who was more than 10 years younger than me. I refused and was taken off."

Other female contestants reported that producers had told them to reject certain men even if they liked them because it made better television.

Influences

Take Me Out is cited by the creators of the website tubecrush.net as being an influence for their website, as they saw it as an example of how the sexual objectification of men had become part of mainstream culture in the UK.

10th series anniversary 
On 24 February 2018, Take Me Out celebrated its 10th series anniversary on ITV with a special edition of the show where the roles were reversed; with four women choosing from 30 men.

Take Me Out – The Album
Take Me Out – The Album is a 60-song compilation album, which was released 18 November 2013.

Track listing

Board game
A board game was released on 3 August 2011 by Rocket Games which features host Paddy McGuinness on the cover of the box. It contains: light and buzzer number unit, 100 single man cards, 50 the power is in your hand cards, 1 single girl pad, 12 isle of FERNANDO'S vouchers, coloured dice and rules.

References

External links
FremantleMedia's Site

.
.

2010s British reality television series
2010 British television series debuts
2019 British television series endings
British dating and relationship reality television series
2010s British game shows
English-language television shows
ITV game shows
Television shows produced by Thames Television
Television series by Fremantle (company)
British television series based on Australian television series